Murdan or Muredan or Moordan may refer to:
 Murdan, Hormozgan (موردن - Mūrdan)
 Murdan, Anbarabad, Kerman Province (موردان - Mūrdān)
 Murdan, Faryab, Kerman Province (موردان - Mūrdān)
 Murdan, Narmashir, Kerman Province (موردان - Mūrdān)
 Murdan, Sistan and Baluchestan (موردان - Mūrdān)